Diwakar Rao Nadipelli (born 1953) is an Indian politician and a legislator of Telangana Legislative Assembly. He won as MLA from Mancherial assembly constituency on Telangana Rashtra Samithi ticket.

Early life
He was born in Adilabad, Telangana to N. Laxman Rao. He is a graduate and did his BA. He was an agriculturist before joining politics.

Career
Diwakar Rao was two time MLA of Indian National Congress in two terms 1999 and 2004.

TRS party
He joined TRS party before the election in 2014. He won as MLA in 2014 from Mancherial assembly constituency.

References

People from Telangana
Living people
People from Adilabad
Telangana Rashtra Samithi politicians
Telangana MLAs 2014–2018
1953 births
Telangana MLAs 2018–2023